ATV: Quad Power Racing is a racing video game developed by Climax Development and published by Acclaim Entertainment under their Acclaim Sports banner for the PlayStation. A Game Boy Advance was released two years later and developed by Tantalus Interactive, and was released under the AKA Acclaim banner.

A sequel, ATV: Quad Power Racing 2, was released in 2003 on sixth-generation consoles.

Gameplay
There are four gameplay modes: championship, single race, time attack, and two-player. In championship mode there are six different playable characters to choose from and twelve tracks to race on. The tracks are separated to three different themes: desert, forest and snow. Objective is to win first place against five other computer-controlled opponents. In the time attack mode and the single race mode objective is to record a high score by time or place respectively. Two-player mode is a race between two human opponents in split screen. The game also features weather effects.

Reception

ATV: Quad Power Racing received "generally unfavorable reviews" on both platforms according to the review aggregation website Metacritic. GameSpots Shane Satterfield wrote that for ATV enthusiasts the PlayStation version may warrant a rental but others who are only mildly into the sport will be disappointed by the game's repetitive graphics, steep learning curve, and overall lack of variety or fun. IGN also gave low marks on the same console version, saying, "This game has little to no balance, very poor racing AI and never really gets past go...or is that Start." Game Vortex gave it a good review but still concluded with: "my final call on ATV Quad Power Racing is that it's an acquired taste for most people, even hard-core racers." In Japan, where the same PlayStation version was ported and published by Acclaim Japan on December 21, 2000, Famitsu gave it a score of 21 out of 40.

References

External links
 
 

2000 video games
ATV: Quad Power Racing 1
Game Boy Advance games
Multiplayer and single-player video games
Off-road racing video games
PlayStation (console) games
Video games developed in Australia
Video games developed in the United Kingdom
Video games scored by Matthew Simmonds
Tantalus Media games